Glenmore Park Redbacks Cricket Club is the largest local cricket club in the Penrith district.

This season GPCC has 20 sides & boasts almost 500 club members. They are affiliated with both the Penrith Junior Cricket Association & Nepean District Cricket Association.

History

Humble Beginnings
Founded in 1996, the Glenmore Park Redbacks was established as a junior club in its early days also going by the name Glenmore Park Junior Cricket Club. Borne out of the needs of a rapidly expanding local district populated mostly by young families, the club provided a local identity for the children of the suburb and surrounding areas to play cricket entering teams into the Penrith Junior Cricket Association. Meanwhile, across town, the Glenmore Park Cricket Club had already been in operation since 1993 entering teams into the local senior competition run by the Nepean District Cricket Association.

Becoming One
Towards the end of the 90's both clubs soon realised each would both benefit from joining forces rather than duplicating their efforts, and in 2000 the two merged forming the club as we know it today, officially adopting the Glenmore Park Cricket Club name and generally referred to as simply The Redbacks.

Ascendency
n less than two decades the Redbacks have gone from strength to strength emerging from its humble beginnings to become what is now the district's largest club in both local junior and senior associations.

Current Committee
President - Colin Rowe
Vice President - Michael Pelle
Senior Secretary - Adrian D'Agostino
Junior Secretary - Grant Kean
Treasurer - Munish Grover

Premierships

Club Championships

NDCA Club Champions 
2009/10
2012/13

PJCA Club Champions
2008/09
2010/11
2011/12
2012/13

Perpetual Trophy Winners
Glenmore Park Cricket Club awards four major awards at the conclusion of each season, Clubman of the Year, a senior & junior Player of the Year & Player of the Finals.

Clubman of the Year
The Clubman of the Year award is considered the highest honour awarded each season by GPCC. Its recipient is considered to have gone above and beyond the call of duty over the season in promoting the values considered most important.

Player of the Year
The Player of the Year awards are selected each year based on a points based system - 15 points a wicket, 1 point per run & 5 points per fielding dismissal. These are then modified by a set percentage based upon which grade the player has performed in. A player of the year is crowned from both the Senior & Junior club.

Player of the Finals
The Player of the Finals was introduced as a senior award in 2009/10, and is awarded to the player that is considered to have produced the performance that has had the biggest impact on a team in the finals series. It is voted on by each of the team captains.

English club cricket teams